Isiolo South Constituency is an electoral constituency in Kenya. It is one of two constituencies of Isiolo County. The constituency has nine wards, all electing councillors to the Isiolo County Council. The constituency was established for the 1966 elections.

Members of Parliament

Locations and wards

References 

Constituencies in Eastern Province (Kenya)
1966 establishments in Kenya
Constituencies established in 1966
Constituencies in Isiolo County